HMS Royal Oak was a  armoured frigate built for the Royal Navy in the 1860s. The lead ship of her class, she is sometimes described as a half-sister to the other three ships because of her different engine and boiler arrangements. Like her sisters, she was converted into an ironclad from a wooden ship of the line that was still under construction.

The ship spent most of her career with the Mediterranean Fleet, only briefly serving with the Channel Fleet. Royal Oak returned home in 1871 for a refit, but was instead placed in reserve to save money. Fourteen years later, still in reserve, she was sold for scrap in 1885.

Design and description
The ship had a draught of  forward and  aft. She displaced  and had a tonnage of 4,056 tons burthen.

Royal Oak had a low centre of gravity which meant that she rolled a lot and was an unsteady gun platform. She was, however, very handy and sailed well in all weathers under sail or steam. Her crew consisted of 585 officers and ratings.

Propulsion
Royal Oak had a simple horizontal 2-cylinder horizontal return connecting-rod steam engine, built by Maudslay, that drove a single propeller shaft using steam that was provided by six rectangular boilers. The engine produced  during the ship's sea trials on 15 June 1863 which gave the ship a maximum speed of  under steam.

Yards were added to the ship's mizzenmast in June 1866 and Royal Oak was given a full ship rig which she retained for the rest of her career. Her propeller was designed to be disconnected and hoisted up into the stern of the ship to reduce drag while under sail, but this was rarely done because there was no bulkhead surrounding the hoisting holes which could have flooded the ship if their covers had been removed in even a moderate sea. To further reduce drag, the funnel was telescopic and could be lowered.

Armament
Royal Oak was initially armed with 24 smoothbore, muzzle-loading 68-pounder guns on the main deck and 11 rifled breech-loading (RBL) Armstrong seven-inch, 110-pounder guns. Eight of these were also on the main deck and the other three served as chase guns on the upper deck, two at the bow and one aft.

All of the guns could fire both solid shot and explosive shells.

The ship's original armament was replaced during her 1867 refit with 20 seven-inch and 8  rifled muzzle-loading guns, four of the seven-inch guns were chase guns.

Armour

Construction and service 

Royal Oak, named for the English oak tree within which King Charles II hid to escape after his defeat at Battle of Worcester in 1651, was laid down on 1 May 1860 at Chatham Dockyard as a 90-gun Bulwark-class ship of the line. She was ordered to be converted to an ironclad on 14 May 1861 and was launched on 10 September 1862. The ship was commissioned in April 1863 to run her trials and completed on 28 May, for the price of £245,537.

Royal Oak briefly served with the Channel Fleet before she was transferred to the Mediterranean Fleet. She was paid off for a refit and re-arming in 1867, and then rejoined the Channel Fleet for six months. Three months later the ship returned to the Mediterranean, and was present at the opening of the Suez Canal on 15 November 1869, where she grounded on an uncharted sandbank outside Port Said, Egypt, without sustaining any damage. She paid off for an extensive refit at Portsmouth at the end of 1871, but was instead laid up as an economy measure. Royal Oak remained in fourth-class reserve for 14 years until she was no longer worth repairing and was sold for breaking up on 30 September 1885.

Memorials
A block of housing within the new development at "Rochester Riverside" has been named after this ship.

Notes

Footnotes

References

External links

 

Bulwark-class battleships (1859)
Prince Consort-class ironclads
Ships built in Chatham
1862 ships
Victorian-era battleships of the United Kingdom
Maritime incidents in November 1869